Brachistosternus ehrenbergii is a scorpion species and the most cited species in the genus Brachistosternus. The species was first described by Paul Gervais in 1841. Its venom is toxic to mice.

References 

Bothriuridae
Taxa named by Paul Gervais
Animals described in 1841
Scorpions of South America